Pyramimitridae, known as mitre shells, are a taxonomic family of sea snails, widely distributed marine gastropod molluscs in the superfamily Mitroidea.

Genera
Genera in the family Pyramimitridae include:
 †Endiatoma Cossmann, 1896 
 Hortia Lozouet, 1999
 † Pyramimitra Conrad, 1865 
 Teremitra Kantor, Lozouet, Puillandre & Bouchet, 2014
 Vaughanites Woodring, 1928

References

 Kantor Y., Lozouet P., Puillandre N. & Bouchet P. (2014) Lost and found: The Eocene family Pyramimitridae (Neogastropoda) discovered in the Recent fauna of the Indo-Pacific. Zootaxa 3754(3): 239–276
 Bouchet P., Rocroi J.P., Hausdorf B., Kaim A., Kano Y., Nützel A., Parkhaev P., Schrödl M. & Strong E.E. (2017). Revised classification, nomenclator and typification of gastropod and monoplacophoran families. Malacologia. 61(1-2): 1-526